Mount O'Neel is a  glaciated mountain summit located in the Chugach Mountains, in the U.S. state of Alaska. Although modest in elevation, relief is significant since the south face of the mountain rises up over 5,400 feet (1,646 m) in less than one mile from the immense Childs Glacier. The peak can be seen from the Copper River Highway.

The peak was named about 1910 by Lawrence Martin, for A. C. O'Neel, Chief Bridge Engineer for Copper River and Northwestern Railway, who built a $1,500,000 steel bridge across the Copper River near the southeast base of this mountain in 1909-1910. The mountain's name was officially adopted in 1930 by the U.S. Board on Geographic Names.

Climate

Based on the Köppen climate classification, Mount O'Neel is located a subpolar oceanic climate zone, with long, cold, snowy winters, and cool summers. Westerly winds coming off the North Pacific Ocean are forced upwards by the Chugach Mountains (orographic lift), causing heavy rainfall. Temperatures can drop below −20 °C with wind chill factors below −30 °C. This climate supports the Childs Glacier to the south, and Grinnell Glacier to the north. The months May through June offer the most favorable weather for viewing and climbing.

See also

List of mountain peaks of Alaska
Geography of Alaska

References

External links

 Weather forecast: Mount O'Neel

O'Neel
O'Neel
North American 1000 m summits